In enzymology, a RNA uridylyltransferase is an enzyme that catalyzes the chemical reaction

UTP + RNAn  diphosphate + RNAn+1

Thus, the two substrates of this enzyme are UTP and RNAn, whereas its two products are diphosphate and RNAn+1.

This enzyme belongs to the family of transferases, specifically those transferring phosphorus-containing nucleotide groups (nucleotidyltransferases).  The systematic name of this enzyme class is UTP:RNA uridylyltransferase. Other names in common use include terminal uridylyltransferase, and TUT.

Structural studies

References 

 

EC 2.7.7
Enzymes of known structure